Patna East was an Assembly constituency in Bihar which existed until 2008. It came under Patna Lok Sabha constituency. From 2008 the seat was succeeded by Patna Sahib Assembly constituency. Nand Kishore Yadav was the last MLA from this constituency.

Members of Legislative Assembly

Election results

Oct 2005 Vidhan Sabha

See also 

 Patna West Assembly constituency
 Patna Central Assembly constituency

References 

Former assembly constituencies of Bihar